Noiseshaper is a dub reggae duo based in Berlin, Germany, consisting of Florian Fleischmann and Axel Hirn. The duo is known for their frequent mixes and remixes of their own songs, as well as those of other artists. Their music includes elements of dub music, conventional reggae, electronic music, and numerous other genres. The duo was formed in Austria in 2000, and relocated to Berlin soon after releasing their debut album, Prelaunch Sequence, in 2001.

Critical reception
In a favorable review of the Signal in the Dominion Post, Lindsay Davis wrote that "Like many new artists dabbling in the irie roots of Babylon, Noiseshaper use reggae as their base and seamlessly blend elements of dub, raga, dancehall, house and electronica into a rich stew."

Discography 
Prelaunch Sequence (Different Drummer, 2001)
The Signal (Different Drummer, 2003)
Rough out There (Echo Beach, 2005)
Real to Reel (Echo Beach/Miracle Sounds, 2006)
Satellite City (Cat'n Roof, 2009)

References

German musical duos
German reggae musical groups
Musical groups established in 2000
Musical groups from Berlin
Dub musical groups
German electronic music groups